Scopula fuscescens is a moth of the  family Geometridae. It is found in Bolivia.

References

Moths described in 1934
Taxa named by Louis Beethoven Prout
fuscescens
Moths of South America